First-seeded Daphne Akhurst defeated Sylvia Harper 10–8, 2–6, 7–5, in the final to win the women's singles tennis title at the 1930 Australian Championships.

Seeds
The seeded players are listed below. Daphne Akhurst is the champion; others show the round in which they were eliminated.

 Daphne Akhurst (champion)
 Louie Bickerton (semifinals)
 Marjorie Cox (quarterfinals)
 Sylvia Harper (finalist)
 Kathleen Le Messurier (quarterfinals)
 Mall Molesworth (quarterfinals)
 Gladys Toyne (quarterfinals)
 Emily Hood (semifinals)

Draw

Key
 Q = Qualifier
 WC = Wild card
 LL = Lucky loser
 r = Retired

Finals

Earlier rounds

Section 1

Section 2

External links
 
  Source for seedings

1930 in women's tennis
1930
1930 in Australian tennis
1930 in Australian women's sport
Women's Singles